Alexeyev, Alekseyev, Alexeiev, Alexeev or Alekseev is a common Russian surname that is derived from the male given name Alexey (Алексей) and literally means Alexey's. Often the same name appears in English in several different transliterations.  Similarly, Alexeyeva, Alekseyeva,  Alexeeva and Alekseeva are female versions of the same last name.

People

Alekseev
 Alekseev (singer) (born 1993), Ukrainian singer
 Anton Alekseyev (born 1984), Ukrainian-born professional footballer in Russia
 Anton Alekseev (mathematician) (born 1967), Russian mathematician
 Evgeny Alekseev (chess player) (born 1985), Russian chess-grandmaster
 Evgeny Alekseev (basketball) (1919–2005), Russian basketball-player and coach
 Fedor Alekseev, Russian-Armenian linguist and journalist
 Mikhail Alekseev (1857–1918), Russian military officer 
 Mikhail Egorovich Alekseev (1949–2014), Soviet and Russian Caucasian-language specialist
 Nikolai Alekseev (Catholic priest) (1869–1952), Russian Greek-Catholic priest
 Nikolai Alekseev (born 1977), Russian gay-rights activist
 Oleg Alekseev (1953–2015) Soviet wrestler
 Vladimir Mikhailovich Alekseev (1932–1980), Russian mathematician

Alekseeva
Alena Alekseeva (born 1989), Russian swimmer
Svetlana Alekseeva (figure skater) (born 1965), Russian ice dancer
Svetlana Alekseeva (model) (born 1999/2000), Russian model and burns survivor

Alexeev
Alexander Alexeev (conductor) (1938–2020), Russian conductor
Dmitri Alexeev (pianist) (born 1947), Russian pianist
Nikita Alexeev (born 1981), Russian ice hockey player 
Vadim Alexeev  (born 1970), Israeli breaststroke swimmer

Aleksejev
Marko Aleksejev (born 1979), Estonian high jumper
Tiit Aleksejev (born 1968), Estonian writer

Alekseyev
Aleksandr Alekseyev (boxer) (born 1981), Russian boxer
Dmitri Alekseyev (born 1973), Russian professional footballer
Fyodor Alekseyev (c. 1753–1824), Russian landscape painter
Nikolay Alekseyev (mayor of Moscow) (1852–1893), Russian entrepreneur, philanthropist, and public figure
Valentin Alekseyev (1924–1994), Russian historian
Valeri Alekseyev (disambiguation), several people
Vasiliy Alekseyev (1942–2011), Russian superheavyweight weightlifter
Vasiliy Mikhaylovich Alekseyev (1881–1951), Russian philologist, sinologist, and academician
Yevgeni Alekseyev (disambiguation), several people

Alexeyev
Alexeyev family, Russian merchant dynasty in the 18th and 19th centuries
Alexander Alexeyev, Soviet intelligence agent and diplomat, ambassador to Cuba
Alexander Nikolayevich Alexeyev, Russian diplomat, ambassador to Serbia
Alexander Yuryevich Alexeyev, Russian diplomat, ambassador to the Council of Europe
Alexander Alexeyev (1891–1975), Russian scientist in the field of electrical engineering
Anatoly Alexeyev (1902–1974), Soviet aircraft pilot and Hero of the Soviet Union
Andrey Alexeyev (officer) (1920–1943), Soviet army officer and Hero of the Soviet Union
Boris Alexeyev (navy officer) (1909–1972), Soviet navy officer and Hero of the Soviet Union
Boris Alexeyev (pilot) (1913–1942), Soviet aircraft pilot and Hero of the Soviet Union 
Boris Alexeyev (1911–1973), Soviet actor, People's Artist of the USSR
Georgy Alexeyev (sculptor) (1881–1951), Russian sculptor and graphic artist
Georgy Alexeyev (pilot) (1917–1943), Soviet aircraft pilot and Hero of the Soviet Union
Grigory Alexeyev (1903–1944), Soviet soldier and Hero of the Soviet Union
Kirill Alexeyev (born 1981), Russian ice hockey player
Mikhail Nikolayevich Alexeyev (1918–2007), Soviet writer
Mikhail Pavlovich Alexeyev (1896–1981), a Soviet literary critic and academician
Nikolay Alexeyev (pilot) (1919–1943), Soviet aircraft pilot and Hero of the Soviet Union
Pavel Alekseyev (pilot) (1912–1985), Soviet aircraft pilot and Hero of the Soviet Union   
Pyotr Alexeyev (1731–1801), Russian ecclesiastic figure and writer
Pyotr Alexeyevich Alexeyev (1849–1891), Russian revolutionary
Pyotr Petrovich Alexeyev (1840–1891), Russian chemist
Rostislav Alexeyev (1916–1980), pioneering Russian Ground effect vehicle designer
Semyon Alexeyev, head of the Alexeyev OKB
Sergei Alexeyev (1924–2013), Russian politician
Vasiliy Mikhaylovich Alexeyev (serviceman) (1900–1944), Soviet army officer and Hero of the Soviet Union 
Vasily Petrovich Alexeyev (1896–1919), one of the founders of Communist youth organizations in Russia
Viktor Alexeyev (1914–1977), Soviet athlete and trainer
Vladimir Alexeyev (scientist) (1852–1919), Russian chemist and physicist
Vladimir Alexeyev (admiral) (1912–1999), Soviet admiral and Hero of the Soviet Union

Alekseyeva
Alla Alekseyeva (born 1934), Russian rower
Tatyana Alekseyeva (born 1963), Russian 400 metre runner

Alexeyeva
Lidiya Alekseyeva (1924–2014), Russian basketball player and coach
Lyudmila Alexeyeva (1927–2018), Moscow Helsinki Group founder and Chairwoman since 1996

Others
Alexandre Alexeieff (1901–1982), Russian artist, filmmaker and illustrator
Konstantin Stanislavski (1863–1938), stage name of actor and director Konstantin Sergeievich Alexeiev

Other
9933 Alekseev, minor planet

See also
Alexeyevsky (disambiguation)
Alexeyevka (disambiguation)

References

Russian-language surnames
Patronymic surnames
Surnames from given names